José Pérez (30 November 1897 – 5 December 1920) was a Uruguayan footballer. He played in 20 matches for the Uruguay national football team from 1913 to 1920. He was also part of Uruguay's squad for the 1916 South American Championship.

References

External links
 

1897 births
1920 deaths
Uruguayan footballers
Uruguay international footballers
Place of birth missing
Association football forwards
Peñarol players